Virgil Gorospe Buensuceso (born April 21, 1988 in Glendale, California) is a Filipino-American former professional basketball player. He last played for the Kia Carnival of the Philippine Basketball Association. He was drafted 48th overall in the 5th round of 2012 PBA Draft by Barangay Ginebra San Miguel, but was left unsigned.

Professional career
Buensuceso was selected 48th overall in the fifth round in the 2012 PBA draft by Barangay Ginebra San Miguel, however he was left unsigned by the team.

In 2013, the GlobalPort Batang Pier signed him after being left unsigned by Barangay Ginebra.

Before the start of the 2014–15 PBA season, he was signed by the expansion team Kia Sorento as a free agent. He was released in the end of the said season after his contract expired.

PBA career statistics

Correct as of September 27, 2015

Season-by-season averages

|-
| align=left | 
| align=left | GlobalPort
| 3 || 3.3 || .000 || .000 || .333 || .3 || .0 || .3 || .0 || .3
|-
| align=left | 
| align=left | Kia
| 29 || 18.6 || .385 || .364 || .780 || 2.6 || 2.2 || 1.1 || .0 || 4.9
|-
| align=left | Career
| align=left |
| 32 || 16.8 || .378 || .364 || .755 || 2.3 || 2.0 || 1.1 || .0 || 4.5

References

1988 births
Living people
American men's basketball players
Basketball players from California
BYU–Hawaii Seasiders men's basketball players
Citrus Owls men's basketball players
Filipino men's basketball players
NorthPort Batang Pier players
Point guards
Sportspeople from Glendale, California
Terrafirma Dyip players
Barangay Ginebra San Miguel draft picks